In mathematics, Sonine's formula is any of several formulas involving Bessel functions found by Nikolay Yakovlevich Sonin.

One such formula is the following integral formula involving a product of three Bessel functions:

where Δ is the area of a triangle with given sides.

References

Special hypergeometric functions